Kunzea flavescens  is a plant in the myrtle family, Myrtaceae and is endemic to Queensland. It is a spreading shrub which has egg-shaped leaves and groups of white or cream-coloured flowers on the ends of the branches in September and October.

Description
The leaves are arranged alternately along the branches and are oblong to lance-shaped with the narrower end towards the base. The leaves are flat, slightly hairy when young and have more than sixty oil glands visible on the lower surface. The flowers are white or cream-coloured and arranged in rounded groups of eight to fifteen flowers on the ends of the branches.

Taxonomy and naming
Kunzea flavescens was first formally described in 1922 by Cyril White and William Francis from a specimen found near Crows Nest by Frederick Hamilton Kenny. The description was published in Proceedings of the Royal Society of Queensland. The specific epithet (flavescens) is a Latin word meaning "slightly yellow".

Distribution and habitat
Growing on rocky ridges in heath and open woodland, K. flavenscens occurs in a few areas in south-east Queensland including near Crows Nest and Biggenden Bluff in the Mount Walsh National Park.

Conservation
Kunzea flavescens is classified as "Least Concern" under the Queensland Nature Conservation Act 1992.

References

flavescens
Flora of Queensland
Plants described in 1922
Myrtales of Australia
Endemic flora of Australia